Edward Weller may refer to:

 Edward Weller (whaler) (1814–1893), founder, with his brothers, of a whaling station on Otago Harbour
 Edward Weller (cartographer) (1819–1884), British engraver and cartographer